"Superbad, Superslick" is a song written and recorded by James Brown. Released as a two-part single in 1975, it charted #28 R&B. Part I of the song was subsequently issued as the B-side of Brown's next single, "Hot (I Need to Be Loved, Loved, Loved, Loved)".  The song also appeared on the album Everybody's Doin' the Hustle & Dead on the Double Bump.

References

James Brown songs
Songs written by James Brown
1975 singles
1975 songs
Polydor Records singles